Alejandro Barcenas Pardo is a Venezuelan philosopher and Assistant Professor of Philosophy at Texas State University. 
He is known for his expertise on Machiavelli's thought.

Books
 Machiavelli's Art of Politics. Leiden & Boston: Brill, 2015. 175 pages.

Translations
 Tao Te Ching  by Lao Tzu. Translation and introduction. Anamnesis, 2014. 182 pages. .
 El Arte de la Guerra by Sun Tzu. Translation and introduction. Anamnesis, 2014. 72 pages. .
 El Príncipe by Niccolò Machiavelli. Translation and introduction. Anamnesis, 2013. 184 pages. .
 El Príncipe by Niccolò Machiavelli. Translation, introduction and notes with José Rafael Herrera. Caracas, Venezuela: Los Libros de El Nacional, Colección Ares No 12, 1999 (reprint 2004, 2006). 125 pages. .

References

External links
Personal Website
Barcenas at Texas State University

21st-century American philosophers
Venezuelan philosophers
Philosophy academics
Philosophers of art
Political philosophers
Texas State University faculty
Living people
University of Hawaiʻi at Mānoa alumni
Central University of Venezuela alumni
Year of birth missing (living people)